The Firemen of Viggiù is a 1949 Italian comedy film directed by Mario Mattoli and starring Nino Taranto.

Plot
In the village of Viggiù the men of the local volunteer fire brigade, believing their famous song "The Firemen of Viggiù" a resounding success, organize various skits and performances in their theater, inviting all the celebrities known at that time.

Totò in the film plays a playboy who falls for the wife (Barzizza) of a seller of textiles (Castellani). The woman is calling her friend, telling her of his secret admirer, calling it "not exactly an Adonis" but trying some feeling of admiration for him. Totò brazenly enters the store and begins to woo the wife, but soon comes her husband, who is afraid to go bankrupt. Totò pretends to be a store dummy, while the man takes his wife away. Then the husband sits to invoke the soul of the father, hoping that he can give him some advice, but suddenly loses his temper and begins to kick the mannequins, always stopping with the dummy before Totò. At one point, Totò moves once accidentally and the man takes it as a sign from his father and begins to talk to the dummy. Totò then pretends to be the soul of the father, and asks for fabrics, jackets, and finally a kiss to his wife.
After the sketch Totò reappears towards the end of the film where he directs the band and then concludes with the number "fanfare of Sharpshooters."

This skit was shown in the film Cinema Paradiso directed by Giuseppe Tornatore.

Cast
 Nino Taranto as himself
 Totò as himself
 Wanda Osiris as herself
 Carlo Dapporto as himself
 Isa Barzizza as actress playing Totò's conquest in the revue
 Mario Castellani as actor playing the jealous husband in the revue
 Ariodante Dalla as himself
 Carlo Campanini as the leader of the firemen
 Ave Ninchi as Gaetana, his wife
 Silvana Pampanini as Fiamma, their daughter, actress in the revue
 Dante Maggio as fireman
 Carlo Croccolo as fireman
 Ughetto Bertucci as fireman
 Laura Gore as soubrette playing as Pomponia in the revue

References

External links

1949 films
1940s Italian-language films
Italian black-and-white films
Films directed by Mario Mattoli
1949 musical comedy films
Italian musical comedy films
1940s Italian films